Alfred J. Amoroso (born 1950) is an American board member and former chairman of Yahoo!. He led the special committee set up at Yahoo! to investigate the CEO misstated college degree. He was formerly president and CEO and a director of Rovi Corporation, later renamed TiVo upon the acquisition of TiVo by Rovi Corporation. Amoroso stepped down as CEO of Rovi in 2011 and was succeeded by Thomas Carson.

He received both a B.S. in Systems Engineering and an M.S. in Operations Research from the Polytechnic University of Brooklyn, now called New York University Tandon School of Engineering.

In April 2013, Amoroso announced that he was stepping down as Yahoo chairman immediately, and would be leaving the board in June 2013. Amoroso was temporarily replaced in the chairman role by director Maynard Webb Jr.

He served on the board of Foundry Networks, Inc., a provider of networking hardware, from October 2000 to December 2008 and as chairman from January 2007 to December 2008, when it was sold to Brocade Communications Systems, Inc. Previously, Amoroso was an advisor to Warburg Pincus, a private equity investment firm, from September 2004 to June 2005.

From July 2002 to August 2004, Amoroso was the president, chief executive officer, and vice chairman of Meta Group, an information technology research and advisory firm. He served as president, chief executive officer and a director of CrossWorlds Software, Inc. from October 1999 until its merger with International Business Machines in January 2002. Recruited by IBM from Price Waterhouse Consulting, he held various positions from November 1993 to October 1999, including serving as a member of the worldwide management committee.

Amoroso began his career with EDS (Electronic Data Systems), serving the company in expanding capacities for a number of years at several locations in Texas, Illinois and Connecticut. He left EDS and founded Computech in Bloomfield, Connecticut, a systems consulting firm which grew to over 50 employees before it was acquired by Price Waterhouse Consulting, where he was named lead technology partner and partner-in-charge of the Worldwide Insurance Consulting Practice.

References

Living people
Directors of Yahoo!
American chairpersons of corporations
American technology chief executives
American corporate directors
Polytechnic Institute of New York University alumni
1951 births
IBM employees
PricewaterhouseCoopers people
Date of birth missing (living people)
Place of birth missing (living people)
20th-century American businesspeople